Askinasia is a genus of mites in the family Acaridae.

Species
 Askinasia aethiopicus Yunker, 1970
 Askinasia antillarum Fain, Yunker, van-Goethem & Johnston, 1982

References

Acaridae